The Camarillas Formation is a geological formation in the Teruel Province of Aragón, Spain whose strata date back to the Early Cretaceous (Barremian stage).

The formation was deposited in the Galve Sub-basin of the Maestrazgo Basin in central-eastern Spain. During deposition, Iberia was an island, separated by seas from North Africa and France. Underlying the Camarillas Formation is the also highly fossiliferous El Castellar Formation and the Artoles Formation rests on top of the formation.

The Camarillas Formation has provided a rich fossil assemblage of fossils of mammals, snakes, turtles, crocodylians, fish, dinosaurs and their eggs. Various tracksites of families of dinosaurs exist in the formation.

Dinosaur remains have been recovered from the formation.

Description 

The Camarillas Formation was first formally defined by Canérot et al. in 1982 and later redefined by Salas (1987).

Both Camarillas and Galve are in the Galve Sub-basin, a section of the Aliaga Basin, in the Iberian Range. All these basins were formed during the Permian–Triassic, when the main faults were active, and they are filled with Mesozoic–Quaternary sediments.

The Upper Permian to Upper Jurassic deposits at the site of the Camarillas Formation are all of continental origin. In a second extensional stage during the Late Jurassic to Early Cretaceous, the Atlantic and the Bay of Biscay opened, and the Iberian Peninsula rotated from left to right. At this time, the sediments were marine or showed the influence of the sea, as shown in the deposits of the Higuerueles and Villar del Arzobispo Formations in the Galve Sub-basin. Finally, during the Early Cretaceous and Oligocene–Miocene there were compressive phases with tectonic inversion and formation of continental basins.

Camarillas Formation, in beds of similar age to the La Maca outcrop in the Galve area where the remains of an iguanodontid dinosaur have been found. The Camarillas fossil site is in light brown clay and limestone rocks with fossil wood remains. The sedimentology is similar to that described in the Galve area, because the Camarillas Formation shows scarcely any lateral variations in facies within the Galve Sub-basin.

The Camarillas Formation sandstone is fluviatile, and four groups of paleochannels are distinguished, the first towards the bottom of the succession. These channels become thinner towards the top, and this was interpreted by Díaz and Yébenes (1987) as evidence that there was an alluvial fan with a multichannel system. The lithology of the deposits which fill these channels and their geometry are typical of low-sinuosity channels. Towards the top of the Camarillas Formation, there is a predominance of deltaic fan deposits with marked marine influence. Nevertheless, Soria (1997) mentioned that she found no facies association whose evolution and geometry suggested a well developed deltaic system.

The formation spreads across the Camarillas graben and the Remenderuelas half-graben.

Fossil content 
The Camarillas Formation has provided a rich fossil assemblage comprising dinosaurs, crocodiles, snakes, turtles, fish and mammals. Several new species were described from the formation, among others the mammals Galveodon nannothus, Eobaatar hispanicus, Crusafontia cuencana, Lavocatia alfambrensis and Parendotherium herreroi, the turtle Galvechelone lopezmartinezae and the crocodyliform Bernissartia fagesii.

Newly described dinosaurs include Iguanodon galvensis, Gideonmantellia amosanjuanae and Camarillasaurus cirugedae, named after the formation.

The following fossils are reported from the formation:

Fuente Arnar outcrop
 near Camarillas village, Teruel Province, Aragón, NE Spain
 Type horizon
 Light brown clay and limestone beds, in which fossil wood remains are common, of the Camarillas Formation, lower Barremian, Lower Cretaceous
 Dinosaurs
 Camarillasaurus cirugedae

Eggs
 Guegoolithus turolensis

Cerrada Roya mine

 Mammals
 Galveodon nannothus
 Eobaatar hispanicus
 Parendotherium herreroi
 Turtles
 Galvechelone lopezmartinezae
 Crocodyliforms
 Bernissartia fagesii
 Theriosuchus sp.
 Snakes
 Meyasaurus sp.
 Paramacellodus sp.
 Dinosaurs
 ?Valdosaurus sp.
 Spinosaurinae indet.
 Camarasauridae indet.
 Nodosauridae indet.
 Pterosaurs
 Istiodactylidae indet.
 Ornithocheiridae indet.
 Pterodactyloidea indet.
 Fish
 Polyacrodus parvidens
 Lonchidion microselachos
 Rhinobatos sp.

San Cristóbal 1

 Iguanodon galvensis
 Dacentrurus sp.
 Spinosaurinae indet.
 Eusauropoda indet.

Poca

 Mammals
 Crusafontia cuencana
 Lavocatia alfambrensis
 Turtles
 Pleurosternidae indet.
 Helochelydridae indet.
 Snakes
 Paramacellodidae indet.
 Dinosaurs
 Eusauropoda indet.
 Dromaeosauridae indet.
 Velociraptorinae indet.
 Baryonychinae indet.
 Heterodontosauridae indet.
 Fish
 Polyacrodus parvidens

La Maca 3

 Dinosaurs
 Iguanodon bernissartensis
 Dromaeosauridae indet.
 ?Allosauroidea indet.
 Other reptiles
 Testudines indet.
 Crocodylia indet.
  Atoposauridae indet.
 Fish
 Lepidotes sp.
 Invertebrates
 Unio sp.

Poyales Barranco Hondo

 Dinosaurs
 Gideonmantellia amosanjuanae
 Theropoda indet.
 Other reptiles
 Testudines indet.
 Mesoeucrocodylia indet.
 Neosuchia indet.

Partida Poyales
 Reptiles
 "Pleurocoelus" valdensis
 Hypsilophodontidae indet.

Pajar Julián Paricio 2

 Sharks
 Cretolamna sp.
 Dinosaurs
 Dromaeosauridae indet.
 Iguanodontidae indet.
 Oofossils
 Elongatoolithidae indet.

La Maca
 Elliptio galvensis

Correlation

Gallery

See also 
 List of dinosaur-bearing rock formations
 Tremp Formation
 Escucha Formation
 La Huérguina Formation
 Villar del Arzobispo Formation

References

Bibliography 

 
   Material was copied from this source, which is available under a Creative Commons Attribution 4.0 International License.

Further reading 

 L. Alcalá, M. G. Lockley, A. Cobos, L. Mampel, and R. Royo Torres. 2016. Evaluating the dinosaur track record: an integrative approach to understanding the regional and global distribution, scientific importance, preservation, and management of tracksites. In P. L. Falkingham, D. Marty, & A. Richter (eds.), Dinosaur Tracks: The Next Steps 100-116
 F. J. Verdú, R. Royo Torres, A. Cobos and L. Alcalá. 2015. Perinates of a new species of Iguanodon (Ornithischia: Ornithopoda) from the lower Barremian of Galve (Teruel, Spain). Cretaceous Research 56:250-264
 
 B. Sánchez Hernández, M. J. Benton, and D. Naish. 2007. Dinosaurs and other fossil vertebrates from the Late Jurassic and Early Cretaceous of the Galve area, NE Spain. Palaeogeography, Palaeoclimatology, Palaeoecology 249:180-21
 J. I. Ruiz Omeñaca, J. I. Canudo, and P. Infante. 2005. Presencia de un posible alosáurido (Dinosauria: Theropoda) en el Cretácico Inferior (Barremiense inferior) de La Maca 3 (Galve, Teruel) [Presence of a possible allosaurid (Dinosauria: Theropoda) in the Lower Cretaceous (lower Barremian) of La Maca 3 (Galve, Teruel)]. In E. Bernáldez, E. Mayoral, & A. Guerreiro dos Santos (eds.), XXI Jornadas de la Sociedad Española de Paleontología. Gestión e Investigación de la Paleontología en el Siglo XXI, Sevilla 117-118
 X. Pereda Suberbiola, P. M. Galton, J. I. Ruiz-Omeñaca and J. I. Canudo. 2005. Dermal spines of stegosaurian dinosaurs from the Lower Cretaceous (Hauterivian-Barremian) of Galve (Teruel, Aragón, Spain). Geogaceta 38:35-38
 J. I. Ruiz Omeñaca and J. I. Canudo. 2003. Dinosaurios (Saurischia, Ornithischia) en el Barremiense (Cretácico Inferior) de la península Ibérica [Dinosaurs (Saurischia, Ornithischia) in the Barremian (Lower Cretaceous) of the Iberian peninsula]. In F. Pérez Lorente (ed.), Dinosaurios y Otros Reptiles Mesozóicos de España 269-312
 J. I. Ruiz Omeñaca, J. I. Canudo, and G. Cuenca-Bescós. 1998. Sobre las especies de Iguanodon (Dinosauria, Ornithischia) encontradas en el Cretácico inferior de España [On the species of Iguanodon (Dinosauria, Ornithischia) found in the Lower Cretaceous of Spain]. Geogaceta 24:275-278
 J. I. Canudo, O. Amo, G. Cuenca Bescós, A. Meléndez, J. I. Ruiz Omeñaca and A. R. Soria. 1997. Los vertebrados del Tithónico-Barremiense de Galve (Teruel, España) [The Tithonian-Barremian vertebrates of Galve (Teruel, Spain)]. Cuadernos de Geologia Ibérica 23:209-241
 J. L. Sanz, A. D. Buscalioni, M.-L. Casanovas and J.-V. Santafé. 1987. Dinosaurios del Cretácico inferior de Galve (Teruel, España) [Dinosaurs from the Lower Cretaceous of Galve (Teruel, Spain)]. Estudios Geológicos, Volumen Extraordinario Galve-Tremp 45-64

 
Geologic formations of Spain
Lower Cretaceous Series of Europe
Cretaceous Spain
Barremian Stage
Sandstone formations
Mudstone formations
Conglomerate formations
Deltaic deposits
Fluvial deposits
Lacustrine deposits
Paleontology in Spain
Formations
Formations